The Secret of the Hills is a 1921 American silent mystery film directed by Chester Bennett and starring Antonio Moreno, Lillian Hall and Kingsley Benedict

Synopsis
While in London an American newspapermen becomes drawn into a deadly intrigue involving the lost treasure of James III of Scotland.

Cast
 Antonio Moreno as Guy Fenton
 Lillian Hall as Marion
 Kingsley Benedict as Lincoln Drew
 George Clair as Francis Freeland
 Walter Rodgers as Benjamin Miltimore
 Elita Proctor Otis as Mrs. Miltimore
 J. Gunnis Davis as Richards
 Frank Thorne as De Vrillefort
 Arthur Sharpe as Sidney Coleridge

References

Bibliography
Wlaschin, Ken . Silent Mystery and Detective Movies: A Comprehensive Filmography. McFarland, 2009.

External links
 

1921 films
1921 mystery films
American silent feature films
American mystery films
American black-and-white films
Films directed by Chester Bennett
Vitagraph Studios films
Films set in London
1920s English-language films
1920s American films
Silent mystery films